Cyrtulus is a genus of sea snails, marine gastropod mollusks in the family Fasciolariidae, the spindle snails, the tulip snails and their allies.

Species
Species within the genus Cyrtulus include:
 Cyrtulus bountyi (Rehder & B. R. Wilson, 1975)
 Cyrtulus galatheae (Powell, 1967)
 Cyrtulus genticus (Iredale, 1936)
 Cyrtulus kilburni (Hadorn, 1999)
 Cyrtulus mauiensis (Callomon & Snyder, 2006)
 Cyrtulus serotinus Hinds, 1843 
 Cyrtulus similis (Baird, 1873)
 Cyrtulus undatus (Gmelin, 1791)

References

 Callomon P., & Snyder, M.A., 2006. On the genus Fusinus in Japan II: F. undatus, F. similis and related Pacific taxa, with the description of F. mauiensis n. sp. (Gastropoda: Fasciolariidae). Venus 65(3): 177-191
 Vermeij G.J. & Snyder M.A. (2018). Proposed genus-level classification of large species of Fusininae (Gastropoda, Fasciolariidae). Basteria. 82(4-6): 57-82

External links
 Hinds R.B. (1843). Descriptions of new shells from the collection of Captain Sir Edward Belcher, R.N., C.B. Annals and Magazine of Natural History. 11: 255-257
 Couto D., Bouchet P., Kantor Yu.I., Simone L.R.L. & Giribet G. (2016). A multilocus molecular phylogeny of Fasciolariidae (Neogastropoda: Buccinoidea). Molecular Phylogenetics and Evolution. 99: 309-322.

 
Gastropod genera